Fedulov is a Russian masculine surname, its feminine counterpart is Fedulova. Notable people with the surname include:

 (born 1966), Russian ice hockey player
Ivan Gronsky (1894–1985), born Fedulov
Nikolay Fedulov, Soviet sprint canoer

Russian-language surnames